El Paseo is a 2010 Colombian road-comedy film directed by Harold Trompetero and starring Antonio Sanint and Carolina Gómez.

Plot
The film is about a family on vacation.
After 11 years of continuous work, Alex Peinado decides to spend a well earned holiday with his family. He goes on a road trip towards Cartagena, with his wife, his mother in law, his two teenage children and his dog Kaiser. But the journey is not his only motivation, as Alex hides a plan that requires them to reach their destination on time. On the way the road trip will become the most incredible adventure, which puts at risk their arrival to the Colombian coast.

Cast
Antonio Sanint as Alex Peinado
Carolina Gómez as Hortensia de Peinado
María Margarita Giraldo as Carmelita
Adelaida López as Milena Peinado
Miguel Canal as Octavio Peinado
Jack Villalobos as Káiser
Luis Fernando Múnera as Dr. Benítez
Álvaro Rodríguez as a Transit Police
Carlos Serrato as Cabeza Rapada chief

Production

Reception

Box office
With 127,460 spectators during the weekend of release, the Colombian film El Paseo leads box office in Colombia.

Critical
The film received more than 1 million viewers in less than 5 weeks in theaters.

References

External links
Official Production Page

2010 films
Colombian comedy films
2010 comedy films
Colombian road movies
2010s Spanish-language films